The Miss República Dominicana 2008 pageant was held on December 3, 2007. That year only 9 candidates competed for the national crown. The chosen winner will represent the Dominican Republic at the Miss Universe 2008. The first runner up will enter in Reina Hispanoamericana 2008. The second runner up will enter in Miss Continente Americano 2008. The third runner up will enter in Miss Caribbean 2009. The fourth runner up will enter in Miss Global Cities 2008. The fifth runner up will enter in Miss Globe International 2008. The sixth runner up will enter in Miss Bikini International 2009.The seventh runner up will enter in Miss Asia Pacific 2009. The eight runner up will enter in Miss Leisure 2009.

Results

Delegates

References

Miss Dominican Republic
2008 beauty pageants
2008 in the Dominican Republic